Butterworth Hospital is a district government funded hospital for the Mnquma Local Municipality area in Butterworth, Eastern Cape in South Africa.The hospital has a bed capacity of 350.

The hospital departments include Emergency department, Paediatric ward, Maternity ward, Obstetrics/Gynecology, Psychiatric Services, Out Patients Department, Surgical Services, Medical Services, Operating Theatre & CSSD Services, Ophthalmology, Pharmacy, Anti-Retroviral (ARV) treatment for HIV/AIDS, X-ray Services, Physiotherapy, NHLS Laboratory, Occupational Services, Oral Health Care Provides, Laundry Services, Kitchen Services and Mortuary.

References
Butterworth Hospital

Hospitals in the Eastern Cape
Amathole District Municipality